Tremont Waters (born January 10, 1998) is an American professional basketball player for the Metropolitans 92 of the LNB Pro A. He played college basketball for the LSU Tigers.

Early life and high school career
Waters played at South Kent School, a private all-boys school in Connecticut for three years. He transferred prior to his senior year to Notre Dame High School in West Haven, Connecticut. In 2015, he tried out for the Puerto Rico men's national basketball team's U-17 squad.  One of the wishes of the late father, was for his son to come to Puerto Rico and explore his Puerto Rican roots on his mother's side, since his mother Vanessa has family in San Juan.

As a senior, he was selected for the Jordan Brand Classic. He initially committed to Georgetown but decommitted after coach John Thompson III was fired. Ranked number 37 overall in his high school class by Rivals.com, Waters committed to LSU and coach Will Wade on June 5, 2017. Waters was the 2017 Gatorade and Register State Player of the Year in Connecticut.

College career
On November 22, 2017, Waters scored a season-high 39 points on 13-of-22 shooting in a 94–84 loss to Marquette. As a freshman at LSU, Waters averaged 15.9 points, 6.0 assists and 3.4 rebounds per game. His 198 assists broke the school record for assists by a freshman set by Ben Simmons. Waters was named to the Freshman All-SEC team and was the Freshman of the Year in Louisiana. After the season, Waters entered his name in the 2018 NBA draft but did not hire an agent to preserve his collegiate eligibility. He announced his return to LSU for his sophomore season on May 29, 2018.

On March 23, 2019 Waters led LSU against the 6th seeded Maryland Terrapins in the NCAA tournament. After a tough win against Yale, Waters played 36 minutes in the game. Waters played most of the game and led his team in assists. Naz Reid, the center for the Tigers, set a pick on the defender. Waters drove into the paint and scooped the ball off of the glass and into the basket for the game-winning score to end the game. During the NCAA Tournament, Waters averaged 33 minutes per game, 17-43 from the field shooting .396%.  He also averaged 4.66 assists, 1.66 steals, and 16.66 points per game.  Tremont Waters was awarded a spot onto the First Team All-SEC team due to his play during the season. Tremont was given the award for his leadership skills on and off of the court.

Professional career

Boston Celtics (2019–2021)
On June 20, 2019, Waters was selected with the 51st overall pick in the 2019 NBA draft by the Boston Celtics. Waters played for the Celtics during the 2019 NBA Summer League season and averaged 10.0 points, 5.3 assists, 2.0 rebounds, and 2.0 steals in 22.5 minutes through the first four games helping the Celtics clinch the number one seed going into the tournament.

On July 12, 2019, Waters' father was found dead at a Super 8 Hotel room in West Haven, Connecticut in an apparent suicide. Despite this, Waters played 32 minutes in the tournament game the following day, July 13. The Celtics fell short to the Grizzlies and were eliminated from Summer League Championship contention despite a 16-point effort from Waters. Waters concluded his 2019 Summer League run leading the team in minutes per game as well as averaging 11.2 points, a team high 4.8 assists, and 2.0 steals. On July 25, 2019, the Celtics announced that they had signed Waters to a two-way contract, splitting time with the Maine Red Claws. He scored 24 points in two games in the NBA G League in November. On November 24, the Celtics recalled Waters after an injury to Kemba Walker. On January 9, 2020, Waters posted 30 points, seven assists and five steals for Maine in a 120-118 triple overtime win over the Capital City Go-Go. He averaged 18.0 points, 7.3 assists, 3.2 rebounds and 1.89 steals per game in 36 G League games. On June 18, 2020, Waters was named NBA G League Rookie of the Year. On November 23, 2020, Waters re-signed with the Celtics.

Wisconsin Herd (2021)
On September 27, 2021, Waters signed with the Milwaukee Bucks. However, he was waived prior to the start of the season. In October 2021, he joined the Wisconsin Herd as an affiliate player. In 13 games, he averaged 17.2 points on .421/.364/.714 shooting, 6.0 assists, and 2.7 steals in 31.5 minutes per game.

Toronto Raptors (2021–2022) 
On December 22, 2021, Waters signed a 10-day contract with the Toronto Raptors.

Washington Wizards (2022) 
On January 1, 2022, Waters signed a 10-day contract with the Washington Wizards via the hardship exemption.

Return to the Herd (2022) 
After his 10-day contracts expired, Waters was reacquired by the Wisconsin Herd. He averaged 15.4 points, 2.5 rebounds and 6.9 assists per game.

South Bay Lakers (2022)
On February 24, 2022, Waters was traded, along with a 2022 second-round pick, to the South Bay Lakers in exchange for Frank Mason III and a 2022 first-round pick.

Gigantes de Carolina (2022)
On March 1, 2022, Waters was selected with the first pick overall in the 2022 Baloncesto Superior Nacional draft by the Gigantes de Carolina joining them after South Bay's season ended.

Tremont made his debut in April 11, 2022, powered Carolina's offense throughout the season, averaged 17.8 points and 8.0 assists 1.7 steals per game. He was selected as BSN Rookie Of The Year 2022 and leading in assists.

Waters joined the Memphis Grizzlies for the 2022 NBA Summer League.

Metropolitans 92 (2022–present) 
On July 23, 2022, Waters signed with Metropolitans 92 of the LNB Pro A.

Career statistics

NBA

Regular season

|-
| style="text-align:left;"| 
| style="text-align:left;"| Boston
| 11 || 1 || 10.8 || .286 || .167 || 1.000 || 1.1 || 1.5 || .9 || .2 || 3.6
|-
| style="text-align:left;"| 
| style="text-align:left;"| Boston
| 26 || 3 || 9.2 || .405 || .395 || .941 || .8 || 2.4 || .6 || .0 || 3.8
|-
| style="text-align:left;"| 
| style="text-align:left;"| Toronto
| 2 || 0 || 21.0|| .250 || .222 ||  || 2.0 || 3.5 || 2.0 || .0 || 4.0
|-
| style="text-align:left;"| 
| style="text-align:left;"| Washington
| 1 || 0 || 8.0|| .500 ||  ||  || .0 || .0 || .0 || .0 || 2.0
|- class="sortbottom"
| style="text-align:center;" colspan="2"| Career
| 40 || 4 || 10.2 || .354 || .296 || .960 || .9 || 2.1 || .8 || .1 || 3.7

Playoffs

|-
| style="text-align:left;"|2020
| style="text-align:left;"|Boston
| 1 || 0 || 2.0 || .000 || .000 ||  || 1.0 || 1.0 || .0 || .0 || 0.0
|-
| style="text-align:left;"|2021
| style="text-align:left;"|Boston
| 3 || 0 || 2.0 || .250 || .000 || .667 || .0 || .7 || .3 || .0 || 1.3
|- class="sortbottom"
| style="text-align:center;" colspan="2"| Career
| 4 || 0 || 2.0 || .200 || .000 || .667 || .3 || .8 || .3 || .0 || 1.0

College

|-
| style="text-align:left;"| 2017–18
| style="text-align:left;"| LSU
| 33 || 32 || 33.0 || .417 || .351 || .801 || 3.4 || 6.0 || 2.0 || .1 || 15.9
|-
| style="text-align:left;"| 2018–19
| style="text-align:left;"| LSU
| 33 || 29 || 32.4 || .429 || .327 || .813 || 2.8 || 5.8 || 2.8 || .1 || 15.3
|- class="sortbottom"
| style="text-align:center;" colspan="2"| Career
| 66 || 61 || 32.7 || .423 || .340 || .807 || 3.1 || 5.9 || 2.4 || .1 || 15.6

References

External links

LSU Tigers bio

1998 births
Living people
American expatriate basketball people in Canada
American men's basketball players
Basketball players from New Haven, Connecticut
Boston Celtics draft picks
Boston Celtics players
LSU Tigers basketball players
Maine Red Claws players
Metropolitans 92 players
Point guards
Puerto Rican men's basketball players
South Bay Lakers players
South Kent School alumni
Toronto Raptors players
Washington Wizards players
Wisconsin Herd players